David Wise (born June 30, 1990) is an American freestyle skier. He is a two-time Olympic gold medalist (2014, 2018) and a four-time X Games Gold Medalist (2012, 2013, 2014, 2018). In 2014, Wise won his third consecutive gold medal at Winter X Games XVIII in Aspen, Colorado, before heading to Sochi for the 2014 Winter Olympics. There, he became the first Olympic gold medalist in the Men's Freeski Halfpipe, which debuted in the Winter Games that year. In 2018, after struggling both personally and professionally since his win in Sochi, Wise won his fourth gold medal at the X Games just before he left for PyeongChang to defend his Olympic title. After a sub-par qualifying competition that placed him in the fifth drop-in position for the finals, Wise failed to complete each of his first two runs due, in both cases, to a binding malfunction. On his third and final run, Wise completed a career-best run to take the gold medal, the second Olympic gold medal of his career, with a score of 97.20.

Personal life
Wise grew up in Reno, Nevada. He started skiing at age three, learning at Sky Tavern just outside of Reno. He grew up skiing with his two sisters, Christy and Jessica, and his father, Thomas. In 2011, Wise joined his first freestyle ski team. In the early years, he also competed in moguls, aerials, big air, and slopestyle under the direction of Clay Beck but eventually gravitated to the halfpipe, one of many "new school" events he watched on TV at the X Games. 

In 2011, he married his girlfriend, Alexandra. The couple has two children: a daughter, Nayeli, and a son, Malachi.

Wise is a Christian. Wise has said, “Skiing for me has always been my act of worship to God, and as long it continues to be, I will keep on skiing. I don’t treat my sport as something that’s meant to glorify me; I try my best to treat it as something that brings glory to God. I worship the Creator by doing what I was created to do. He gave me the talent and continues to provide opportunities for me, so I’m going to go out there and use every one as an act of worship.”

References

External links
 
 
 
 
 
 

1990 births
Living people
American male freestyle skiers
X Games athletes
Superpipe skiers
Freestyle skiers at the 2014 Winter Olympics
Freestyle skiers at the 2018 Winter Olympics
Freestyle skiers at the 2022 Winter Olympics
Olympic freestyle skiers of the United States
Medalists at the 2014 Winter Olympics
Medalists at the 2018 Winter Olympics
Medalists at the 2022 Winter Olympics
Olympic gold medalists for the United States in freestyle skiing
Olympic silver medalists for the United States in freestyle skiing
Sportspeople from Nevada
Sportspeople from Reno, Nevada
American Christians